The aquatic garter snake (Thamnophis atratus) is a species of colubrid snake. Three subspecies are currently recognized.

Geographic range
It is found exclusively along the coast of Oregon and California.

Description 
The aquatic garter snake grows up to 18-40 inches (46–102 cm) long. Its dorsal coloration varies greatly. The different coloration patterns are: pale gray with alternating rows of darker blotches on the sides, dark brown with borders that are less distinct, or nearly all black. A long yellow stripe running down the back may be present or absent, only confined to the neck, or just very indistinct. The throat and underside of the snake are whitish to yellow.

One color morph of the aquatic garter snake has a blue-gray background color with a faint olive-colored dorsal stripe and white dots along its sides. Another color morph has a yellow dorsal stripe with black spots along its sides. The second color morph has the more classic garter snake look; however, due to its behavior and scalation, it is grouped in this species.

Habitat 
It can most commonly be found on the edges of bushlands, woodlands, grasslands, and forests near ponds, marshes, streams and lakes.

Behavior 
When feeling threatened, this snake will seek shelter in a nearby water source. Occasionally, while the snake is hunting for food in a stream, it will flick its tongue above the water to mimic an insect that a small fish would usually eat, thus luring the prey into its mouth.

Reproduction
The aquatic garter snake bears live young. Broods consist of three to 12 young.

Subspecies 

Santa Cruz garter snake, T. a. atratus (Kennicott, 1860)
Oregon garter snake, T. a. hydrophilus  Fitch, 1936
Diablo Range garter snake, T. a. zaxanthus Boundy, 1999

References 

Peterson Field Guide - Western Reptiles and Amphibians - 3rd Edition

Thamnophis
Reptiles of the United States
Fauna of California
Biota of Oregon
Fauna of the California chaparral and woodlands
Fauna of the San Francisco Bay Area
Reptiles described in 1860
Taxa named by Robert Kennicott